HMAS Bass (GPV 902) was an Explorer class general-purpose vessel of the Royal Australian Navy (RAN), serving in a range of capacities from 1960 until 1994.

Design and construction

The Explorer class was a two-ship class of general-purpose vessels built for the RAN. The ships had a displacement of 207 tons at standard load and 260 tons at full load. Propulsion machinery consisted of GM diesels, which supplied  to the two propeller screws, and allowed the vessel to reach . The ship's company consisted of 14 personnel. The ship's armament of light weapons (two .303 Bren guns) were only fitted as needed.

Bass was laid down by Walkers Limited of Maryborough, Queensland in May 1959. She was commissioned into the RAN on 15 November 1960.

Operational history
From 1963, Bass operated with the coastwatchers organisation.

By July 1967, the ship had been assigned to Hobart for hydrographic survey duties, and for service as a training vessel to the Royal Australian Navy Reserve Port Division based there. She continued in this role until June 1982, when she was replaced by the patrol boat .

On 17 December, Bass was formally decommissioned, but remained in service as Waterhens training vessel. In October 1985, Bass was reassigned to the Darwin Port Division of the Royal Australian Navy Reserve.

In 1994, Bass was paid off and sold. The vessel entered civilian service as MV Bass.

Civilian owners have included Sydney Harbour and foreshore identities, John Giddens, Jeff Devine and Danny Black.

References
Citations

Bibliography

External links
MV Bass - Website following the restoration of the vessel

1960 ships
Explorer-class general-purpose vessels
Ships built in Queensland